General José María de la Cueva, 14th Duke of Alburquerque (1775–1811) was an aristocrat, diplomat, and senior Spanish officer in the Peninsular War.

Biography
Alburquerque was born on 10 December 1775 and joined the army at the age of 17. In July 1809, Alburquerque commanded the 2nd Cavalry Division of the Spanish Army of the Centre at the Battle of Talavera. He lost the Battle of Arzobispo (8 August 1809). In 1810, Alburquerque commanded the Army of Estremadura and on 4 February entered Cadiz with 11,000 men, securing it as a Spanish base. He was appointed governor of the city, but he fell out with General Gregorio García de la Cuesta and resigned. In March 1810, he was appointed Spanish ambassador to the Court of Saint James in London. He died in 1811, and his funeral took place in Westminster Abbey.

See also
 Duke of Alburquerque

Notes

References

1775 births
1811 deaths
Spanish generals
Ambassadors of Spain to the United Kingdom of Great Britain and Ireland
Dukes of Albuquerque
Spanish commanders of the Napoleonic Wars